para-Methoxyamphetamine (PMA), also known as 4-methoxyamphetamine (4-MA), is a designer drug of the amphetamine class with serotonergic effects. Unlike other similar drugs of this family, PMA does not produce stimulant, euphoriant, or entactogen effects, and behaves more like an antidepressant in comparison, though it does have some psychedelic properties.

PMA has been found in tablets touted as MDMA (ecstasy) although its effects are markedly different compared to those of MDMA. The consequences of such deception have often included hospitalization and death for unwitting users. PMA is commonly synthesized from anethole, the flavor compound of anise and fennel, mainly because the starting material for MDMA, safrole, has become less available due to law enforcement action, causing illicit drug manufacturers to use anethole as an alternative.

Adverse effects 

PMA has been associated with numerous adverse reactions including death. Effects of PMA ingestion include many effects of the hallucinogenic amphetamines including accelerated and irregular heartbeat, blurred vision, and a strong feeling of intoxication that is often unpleasant. At high doses unpleasant effects such as nausea and vomiting, severe hyperthermia and hallucinations may occur. The effects of PMA also seem to be much more unpredictable and variable between individuals than those of MDMA, and sensitive individuals may die from a dose of PMA by which a less susceptible person might only be mildly affected. While PMA alone may cause significant toxicity, the combination of PMA with MDMA has a synergistic effect that seems to be particularly hazardous. Since PMA has a slow onset of effects, several deaths have occurred where individuals have taken a pill containing PMA, followed by a pill containing MDMA some time afterwards due to thinking that the first pill was not active.

Overdose 

PMA overdose can be a serious medical emergency that may occur at only slightly above the usual recreational dose range, especially if PMA is mixed with other stimulant drugs such as cocaine or MDMA. Characteristic symptoms are pronounced hyperthermia, tachycardia, and hypertension, along with agitation, confusion, and convulsions. PMA overdose also tends to cause hypoglycaemia and hyperkalaemia, which can help to distinguish it from MDMA overdose. Complications can sometimes include more serious symptoms such as rhabdomyolysis and cerebral hemorrhage, requiring emergency surgery. There is no specific antidote, so treatment is symptomatic, and usually includes both external cooling, and internal cooling via IV infusion of cooled saline. Benzodiazepines are used initially to control convulsions, with stronger anticonvulsants such as phenytoin or thiopental used if convulsions continue. Blood pressure can be lowered either with a combination of alpha blockers and beta blockers (or a mixed alpha/beta blocker), or with other drugs such as nifedipine or nitroprusside. Serotonin antagonists and dantrolene may be used as required. Despite the seriousness of the condition, the majority of patients survive if treatment is given in time, however, patients with a core body temperature over 40 °C at presentation tend to have a poor prognosis.

Pharmacology 

PMA acts as a selective serotonin releasing agent (SSRA) with weak effects on dopamine and norepinephrine transporters. However, relative to MDMA, it is considerably less effective as a releaser of serotonin with properties more akin to a reuptake inhibitor in comparison. It evokes robust hyperthermia in rodents while producing only modest hyperactivity and serotonergic neurotoxicity, substantially lower than that caused by MDMA, and only at very high doses. Accordingly, it is not self-administered by rodents unlike amphetamine and MDMA, and anecdotal reports by humans suggest it is not particularly euphoric at all, perhaps even dysphoric in contrast. PMA has also been shown to act as a potent, reversible inhibitor of the enzyme MAO-A with no significant effects on MAO-B, and the combination of this property and serotonin release is likely responsible for its high lethality potential.

It appears that PMA elevates body temperatures dramatically; the cause of this property is suspected to be related to its ability to inhibit MAO-A and at the same time releasing large amounts of serotonin, effectively causing serotonin syndrome.  Amphetamines, especially serotonergic analogues such as MDMA, are strongly contraindicated to take with MAOIs.  Many amphetamines and adrenergic compounds raise body temperatures, whereas some tend to produce more euphoric activity or peripheral vasoconstriction, and may tend to favor one effect over another. It appears that PMA activates the hypothalamus much more strongly than MDMA and other drugs like ephedrine, thereby causing rapid increases in body temperature (which is the major cause of death in PMA mortalities). Many people taking PMA try to get rid of the heat by taking off their clothes, taking cold showers or wrapping themselves in wet towels, and even sometimes by shaving off their hair.

History 
PMA first came into circulation in the early 1970s, where it was used intentionally as a substitute for the hallucinogenic properties of LSD. It went by the street names of "Chicken Powder" and "Chicken Yellow" and was found to be the cause of a number of drug overdose deaths (the dosages taken being in the range of hundreds of milligrams) in the United States and Canada from that time.  Between 1974 and the mid-1990s, there appear to have been no known fatalities from PMA.

Several deaths reported as MDMA-induced in Australia in the mid-1990s are now considered to have been caused by PMA, the users unaware that they were ingesting PMA and not MDMA as they had intended. There have been a number of PMA-induced deaths around the world since then.

In July 2013, seven deaths in Scotland were linked to tablets containing PMA that had been mis-sold as ecstasy and which had the Rolex crown logo on them. Several deaths in Northern Ireland, Particularly East Belfast were also linked to "Green Rolex" pills during that month.

In 2014, 2015 and early 2016, PMA sold as ecstasy was attributed for more deaths in the United States, United Kingdom, Netherlands, and Argentina. The pills containing the drug were reported to be red triangular tablets with a "Superman" logo.

The Red Ferarri pills are a new press of the Superman logo tablets that were reported to be found in Germany and Norway from 2016-2017.

Society and culture

Legal status

International
PMA is a Schedule I drug under the Convention on Psychotropic Substances.

Australia
PMA is considered a Schedule 9 prohibited substance in Australia under the Poisons Standard (October 2015). A Schedule 9 substance is a substance which may be abused or misused, the manufacture, possession, sale or use of which should be prohibited by law except when required for medical or scientific research, or for analytical, teaching or training purposes with approval of Commonwealth and/or State or Territory Health Authorities.

Germany
PMA is part of the Appendix 1 of the Betäubungsmittelgesetz. Therefore owning and distribution of PMA is illegal.

Netherlands
On 13 June 2012 Edith Schippers, Dutch Minister of Health, Welfare and Sport, revoked the legality of PMA in the Netherlands after five deaths were reported in that year.

United Kingdom
PMA is a Class A drug in the UK.

United States
PMA is classified as a Schedule I hallucinogen under the Controlled Substances Act in the United States.

Economics

Distribution

Because PMA is given out through the same venues and distribution channels that MDMA tablets are, the risk of being severely injured, hospitalized or even dying from use of ecstasy increases significantly when a batch of ecstasy pills containing PMA starts to be sold in a particular area. PMA pills could be a variety of colours or imprints, and there is no way of knowing just from the appearance of a pill what drug(s) it might contain. Notable batches of pills containing PMA have included Louis Vuitton, Mitsubishi Turbo, Blue Transformers, Red/Blue Mitsubishi and Yellow Euro pills. Also PMA has been found in powder form.

Analogues 

Four analogues of PMA have been reported to be sold on the black market, including PMMA, PMEA, 4-ETA and 4-MTA.  These are the N-methyl, N-ethyl, 4-ethoxy and 4-methylthio analogues of PMA, respectively. PMMA and PMEA are anecdotally weaker, more "ecstasy-like" and somewhat less dangerous than PMA itself, but can still produce nausea and hyperthermia similar to that produced by PMA, albeit at slightly higher doses. 4-EtOA was briefly sold in Canada in the 1970s, but little is known about it. 4-MTA, however, is even more dangerous than PMA and produces strong serotonergic effects and intense hyperthermia, but with little to no euphoria, and was implicated in several deaths in the late 1990s.

See also 

 1-Aminomethyl-5-methoxyindane (AMMI)
 2-Methoxyamphetamine (OMA)
 3-Methoxyamphetamine (MMA)
 4-Methylamphetamine (4-MA)
 4-Ethoxyamphetamine (4-ETA)
 4-Methylthioamphetamine (4-MTA)
 4-Methoxy-N-ethylamphetamine (PMEA)
 4-Methoxy-N-methylamphetamine (PMMA)
 4-Hydroxy-N-methylamphetamine (pholedrine)
Anisomycin

References

External links 
 PiHKAL PMA entry
 PMA entry in PiHKAL • info
Death drug may become health crisis, news.ninemsn.com.au article, Issued 22 February 2007.

Substituted amphetamines
Monoamine oxidase inhibitors
Phenol ethers
Designer drugs
Serotonin releasing agents
Serotonin receptor agonists
Methoxy compounds